The Gyrfalcon Islands are an uninhabited island group in the Qikiqtaaluk Region of Nunavut, Canada. Tiercel Island and Qikirtajuaq Island lie to the southwest. The closest community is the Inuit village of Kuujjuaq,  to the southeast.

Geography
The islands are organized in series of north-west and south-east parallel chains. Their habitat is characterized by high, powerful tides, open sea, coastal cliffs, and rocky marine shores.

Flora
Vegetation is sparse, though tundra plants can be found away from shore. These include Arctic willow, crowberry, sedges, mosses and lichens.

Fauna
The Gyrfalcon Islands are a Canadian Important Bird Area (#NU028). Their notable bird species includes the common eider.

Walrus frequent the area during the summer.

References

External links 
 Gyrfalcon Islands in the Atlas of Canada - Toporama; Natural Resources Canada

Uninhabited islands of Qikiqtaaluk Region
Archipelagoes of the Canadian Arctic Archipelago
Important Bird Areas of Qikiqtaaluk Region